The 1939 Oregon Webfoots football team represented the University of Oregon in the Pacific Coast Conference (PCC) during the 1939 college football season. Led by second-year head coach Tex Oliver, the Webfoots compiled a 3–4–1 record (3–3–1 in PCC, fifth), outscored their opponents 101 to 74, and recorded three shutouts.

Oregon played three home games on campus at Hayward Field in Eugene and one at Multnomah Stadium in Portland.

Schedule

References

External links
 WSU Libraries: Game video – Washington State at Oregon – November 4, 1939

Oregon
Oregon Ducks football seasons
Oregon Webfoots football